Lack may refer to:

Places 
 Lack, County Fermanagh, a townland in Northern Ireland
 Lack, Poland
 Łąck, Poland
 Lack Township, Juniata County, Pennsylvania, US

Other uses 
 Lack (surname)
 Lack (manque), a term in Lacan's psychoanalytic philosophy
 "Lack" (song), by Porno Graffitti, 2003
 IKEA Lack, a table manufactured by IKEA

See also 
 Lakh, a term in India for 100,000
 Lac (disambiguation)
 Lak (disambiguation)
 Henrietta Lacks (1920–1951), African-American woman whose cancer cells are the source of the immortalized HeLa cell line
 359426 Lacks, a main-belt asteroid named after Henrietta Lacks